Studio Uno 66 is an album by Italian singer Mina.

The album was released in the spring of 1966, topping the charts and yielding three top fifteen singles - "Ta-ra-ta-ta", "Una casa in cima al mondo" and "Se telefonando".

"Se telefonando" is Mina's flawless interpretation of a difficult song, composed and arranged by Ennio Morricone to lyrics by Maurizio Costanzo. The main theme of the song thrills around just three notes, taken from the siren of a police car in Marseilles. In the reader's poll conducted by the la Repubblica newspaper to celebrate Mina's 70th anniversary in 2010, 30,000 voters picked the track as the best song ever recorded by Mina.

BMG reissued the album on CD in 1997.

Track listing

Side A

Side B

References

1966 albums
Mina (Italian singer) albums
Italian-language albums